Razer may refer to:
 Razer (Canadian TV channel), former name of MTV2, a Canadian digital television specialty service
 Razer Inc., a Singaporean-American computer peripherals manufacturer specializing in PC gaming
 Razer Phone, a smartphone designed and developed by Razer Inc.
 Razer (robot), a contestant on the series Robot Wars
 Razer Airport, airport serving Koran va Monjan, Badakhshan, Afghanistan
 Razer, a main character in Green Lantern: The Animated Series
 Razer, a character in SWAT Kats: The Radical Squadron

People
 Greg Razer, American politician
 Helen Razer (born 1968), Australian radio presenter and writer

See also
Razor (disambiguation)
Razar (disambiguation)
 Rasor (disambiguation)